The Karađorđević dynasty (Карађорђевићи / Karađorđevići) or House of Karađorđević is the name of the deposed Serbian and former Yugoslav royal family. 

The family was founded by Karađorđe Petrović (1768–1817), the Veliki Vožd of Serbia during the First Serbian uprising of 1804–1813. In the course of the 19th century the relatively short-lived dynasty was supported by the Russian Empire and was opposed to the Austrian-supported Obrenović dynasty. The two houses subsequently vied for the throne for several generations. 

Following the assassination of the Obrenović King Alexander I of Serbia in 1903, the Serbian Parliament chose Karađorđe's grandson, Peter I Karađorđević, then living in exile, to occupy the throne of the Kingdom of Serbia. He was duly crowned as King Peter I, and shortly before the end of World War I in 1918, representatives of the three peoples proclaimed a Kingdom of the Serbs, Croats and Slovenes with Peter I as sovereign. In 1929, the kingdom was renamed Yugoslavia, under Alexander I, the son of Peter I. In November 1945 the family lost their throne when the League of Communists of Yugoslavia seized power during the reign of Peter II.

Name
In English, the family name can be anglicized as Karageorgevitch (e.g., as with Prince Bojidar Karageorgevitch and Prince Philip Karageorgevitch) or romanised as Karadjordjevic. Its origin is as a patronym of the sobriquet Karađorđe, bestowed upon the family's founder, Đorđe Petrović, at the end of the 18th century.  

In 1796, Osman Pazvantoğlu, the renegade governor of the Ottoman Sanjak of Vidin, who had rejected the authority of the Sublime Porte, launched an invasion of the Pashalik of Belgrade, governed by Hadji Mustafa Pasha since 1793. Overwhelmed, Mustafa Pasha formed a Serbian national militia to help stop the incursion. Đorđe Petrović joined the militia and became a boluk-bashi, leading a company of 100 men. After the Serb militias joined the war on Mustafa Pasha's side, Pazvantoğlu suffered a string of defeats. He retreated to Vidin, which was subsequently besieged. The war against Pazvantoğlu marked the first time that Petrović had distinguished himself in the eyes of the Ottomans, who bestowed upon him the sobriquet "Black George", partly because of his dark hair and partly because of his sinister reputation.

Ancestry
According to some researchers, Karađorđe's paternal ancestors most likely migrated from the Highlands (in what is today Montenegro) to Šumadija during the Second Great Serb Migration in 1737–39 under the leadership of Patriarch Šakabenta, as a result of the Austro-Turkish War (in which Serbs took part). Serbian historiography accepted the theory that Karađorđe's ancestors came from Vasojevići.

Some conjecture has arisen about where the family ended up after arriving in Šumadija. According to Radoš Ljušić, Karađorđe's ancestors most likely hailed from Vasojevići, but he has said there is no certain historical information on Karađorđe's ancestors or where they came from, folklore being the only real source. Most likely, Karađorđe's ancestors hailed from Vasojevići. Grigorije Božović (1880–1945) claimed that the family were Srbljaci (natives) in Vasojevići territory. Contributing to Srbljak theory is the fact that the family celebrated St Clement as their Slava until 1890, while the patron saint of Vasojevići, i.e. Vaso's descendants, is Archangel Michael. King Peter I was allowed to change his Slava to St Andrew the First-called by Belgrade Metropolitan Mihailo in 1890, following the death of his wife, Princess Zorka, thus honoring the date by Julian calendar when Serbian rebels liberated Belgrade during the First Serbian Uprising. 

Furthermore, King Peter chose Voivode of Vasojevići Miljan Vukov Vešović to be his bridesman during his wedding to princess Zorka in 1883. Upon being asked by his future father-in-law prince Nicholas why he chose Miljan amongst various Voivodes of Montenegro, he replied that he chose him because of heroism and relation describing him as Vojvode of my own blood and kin. His son, Alexander, who was born in Cetinje was nicknamed Montenegrin The Vasojevići tribe claim descent from Stefan Konstantin of the Nemanjić dynasty. The Vasojevići were proud of Karađorđe, and saw him as their kinsman. Montenegrin politician and Vasojević Gavro Vuković, supported this theory. Accordingly, Alexander Karađorđević (1806–1885) was given the title "Voivode of Vasojevići" by Petar II in 1840. Other theories include: Montenegrin historian Miomir Dašić claimed that Karađorđe's family originated from the Gurešići from Podgorica in Montenegro. Folklorist Dragutin Vuković believed that Tripko Knežević–Guriš was Karađorđe's great-grandfather; Vukićević, writing in 1907, said that in the surroundings of Podgorica, there is a local claim that Karađorđe's ancestors initially came from Vranj.

The family claimed descent from the Vasojevići tribe (in Montenegro) and had emigrated in the late 1730s or early 1740s. The family lived in Mačitevo (in Suva Reka), from where grandfather Jovan moved to Viševac, while Jovan's brother Radak moved to Mramorac.

List of monarchs

Current claims to the throne
The Karađorđevići are active in Serbian society in various ways. There is a view that constitutional parliamentary monarchy would be the ultimate solution for stability, unity, and continuity in Serbia. In addition, the family supports Serbia as a democratic country with a future in the European Union.

The last crown prince of Yugoslavia, Alexander, has lived in Belgrade at the Dedinje Royal Palace since 2001. As the only son of the last king, Peter II, who never abdicated, and the last official heir of the Kingdom of Yugoslavia he claims to be the rightful heir to the Serbian throne in the event of restoration. At the palace, Alexander regularly receives religious leaders and strives, as opportunity permits, to demonstrate his commitment to human rights and to democracy. The family are also much engaged in humanitarian work. Crown Princess Katherine has a humanitarian foundation while Crown Prince Alexander heads the Foundation for Culture and Education, whose activities include student scholarships, summer camps for children, etc. 

On 27 April 2022, Prince Peter Karageorgevitch renounced his title of Hereditary prince – for himself and his descendants – and his younger brother Prince Philip became their father's heir apparent. The ceremony took place at Casa de Pilatos in Seville, Spain. Present were Peter's and Philip's mother Princess Maria Da Gloria of Orléans-Braganza, Duchess of Segorbe and their stepfather Ignacio, 19th Duke of Segorbe; Philip's wife Princess Danica; their half-sister Sol, Countess of Ampurias; Ljubodrag Grujić, a member of the Crown Council and Chancellor of the Orders and Herald of the House of Karađorđević; and Nikola Stanković, Chief of Staff of the Crown Prince.

Serbia and Yugoslavia

The Karađorđević family initially was a Serbian Royal House, then the Royal House of the Serbs, Croats and Slovenes and then the Royal House of Yugoslavia. When they last reigned they were called the Royal House of Yugoslavia.

Crown Prince Alexander was born in London but on property temporarily recognized by the United Kingdom's government as subject to the sovereignty of the Yugoslav crown, on which occasion it was publicly declared that the Crown Prince had been born on the native soil of the land he was expected to eventually rule.

Heraldry

Male descendants of Karađorđe 
The list below includes male members of the Karađorđević dynasty. Bold denotes the current head of the House. Number in parentheses indicates the order of line of Succession to the throne, as of April 2022. The order of line of Succession is not official.

  Grand Leader Karađorđe (1768–1817)
Alexis (1801–1830)
George (1827–1884)
Prince Alexis (1859–1920)
Prince Bojidar (1862–1908)
 Prince Alexander (1806–1885)
Alexis (1836–1841)
Hereditary Prince Svetozar (1841–1847)
 King Peter I (1844–1921)
Prince George (1887–1972)
 King Alexander I (1888–1934)
 King Peter II (1923–1970)
 Crown Prince Alexander (b. 1945)
Prince Peter (b. 1980)
(1) Hereditary Prince Philip (b. 1982)
 (2) Prince Stephen (b. 2018)
(3) Prince Alexander (b. 1982)
Prince Tomislav (1928–2000)
(4) Prince Nicholas (b. 1958)
(5) Prince George (b. 1984)
(6) Prince Michael (b. 1985)
Prince Andrew (1929–1990)
Prince Christopher (1960–1994)
(7) Prince Vladimir (b. 1964)
Prince Kirill (2001–2001)
(8) Prince Dimitri (b. 1965)
Prince Andrew (1890–1890)
Prince Andrew (1848–1864)
Prince George (1856–1889)
Prince Arsen (1859–1938)
 Prince Regent Paul (1893–1976)
Prince Alexander (1924–2016)
Prince Dimitri (b. 1958)
Prince Michael (b. 1958)
Prince Sergius (b. 1963)
(illegit.) Umberto (b. 2018)
Prince Dushan (b. 1977)
Prince Nicholas (1928–1954)

Notes

References

External links

Crown Prince Alexander's Foundation for Culture and Education 
Princess Katherine's Humanitarian Foundation

 
Modern history of Serbia
19th century in Serbia
20th century in Serbia
1804 establishments in Serbia
1813 disestablishments in Serbia
1842 establishments in Serbia
1858 disestablishments in Serbia
1903 establishments in Serbia
1945 disestablishments in Yugoslavia